Neblinichthys yaravi is a species of armored catfish endemic to Venezuela where it is found in the Kukenan River basin. This species grows to a length of  SL.

References

Ancistrini
Mammals of Venezuela
Endemic fauna of Venezuela
Fish described in 1915